The Hope Highway, also known as the Hope Road Turnoff, is a Forest Highway located in the Kenai Peninsula Borough, in the U.S. state of Alaska. The highway connects the city of Hope to the Seward Highway, and travels through  of the Chugach National Forest. The road passes the ghost town of Sunrise City and several smaller settlements, remnants of the gold rush that occurred in that area. The highway was created circa 1928 and was designated as Forest Highway 14 by the Federal Highway Administration.

Route description

The Hope Highway begins at an intersection with the Seward Highway (AK-1), inside Chugach National Forest. The highway proceeds north, traveling through several miles of pine forest, in a valley in the Kenai Mountain range. The highway passes alongside the Resurrection Creek, which was the source for the settlement of this area. The road proceeds through the abandoned settlement of Sunrise City, which was an old mining town. The roadway proceeds to the Turnagain Arm, and turns in a westward direction. The road continues along the arm for several miles before entering the city of Hope. The highway passes through Hope, intersecting the Old Hope Highway and several smaller streets before exiting the town and reentering the forest. The highway reaches its northern terminus, an access road to the Porcupine Creek Campgrounds. The entire length of the Hope Highway is located in the Chugach National Forest. No portion of the highway is listed on the National Highway System.

Traffic
Traffic on the Hope Highway is very low, with the highest traffic count being just over 400 vehicles daily, at its intersection with the Seward Highway. The daily average vehicle count for the highway is just under 300.

History
The Hope Highway was first established in 1928. The original highway connected the city of Hope to Moose Pass, which then took people to Anchorage via the Alaska Railroad. The Seward Highway was completed in 1951, which allowed travelers to get to Hope without having to transport their vehicle on a train. The highway operated as an improved dirt road until 1952 or 1953, when the highway was finally paved. The portion of the highway that connected Hope to the campgrounds was created in the 1970s. Around the same time as the extension of the route, the Hope Highway was rerouted around the city of Hope, with the original path that traveled through the city being renamed the Old Hope Highway. In 1982, during the expansion of the Federal Forest Highway System, the Hope Highway was added to the system, due to its location and local importance.

Major junctions

Old Hope Highway
The Old Hope Highway is a short, historic route of the Hope Highway located in the city of Hope. The road has an unpaved, gravel surface, and passes several small businesses and homes located in Hope. The road was part of the original Hope Highway, which was created in 1928, and remained part of the highway until circa 1970, when the highway was rerouted around Hope.

References

Roads in Alaska
Forest Highways in the United States